Margiris Normantas (born 27 October 1996) is a Lithuanian professional basketball player for Rytas Vilnius of the Lithuanian Basketball League (LKL).

Early career
Before starting his professional career, Normantas played for KM-Citus Vilnius in the third-tier RKL, averaging 15.8 points, 3.7 rebounds and 4.8 assists in the 2014–15 season.

Professional career
In September 2015, Normantas signed a long-term contract with Lietuvos rytas Vilnius and was subsequently loaned to BC Perlas-MRU of the National Basketball League (NKL). In his first season with the team, he averaged 10.4 points, 2.8 rebounds, 3.0 assists and 1.8 steals per game. In the 2016–17 season, his production increased to 15.3 points, 3.7 rebounds, 4.1 assists and 2.1 steals per game.

On 22 December 2017, Normantas was loaned to Nevėžis Kėdainiai of the Lithuanian Basketball League (LKL).
He spent the 2018–2019 season with Rytas, though was never much of a rotation player and was released after the season. 

On 28 August 2019, Normantas signed with Lietkabelis Panevėžys of the Lithuanian Basketball League. On 16 June 2020, his contract was extended for an additional year. In 47 games played for Lietkabelis in the 2020–21 season (in the LKL and the EuroCup), Normantas averaged 12.2 points, 2.5 rebounds, 3.3 assists and 1.6 steals per game.

On 15 July 2021, Normantas returned to Rytas Vilnius, signing a two-year contract.

References

External links
Margiris Normantas at euroleaguebasketball.net
Margiris Normantas at realgm.com

1996 births
Living people
BC Lietkabelis players
BC Nevėžis players
BC Rytas players
Lithuanian men's basketball players
Point guards
Shooting guards